Quercus quangtriensis is a tree species in the beech family Fagaceae; there are no known subspecies. It is placed in subgenus Cerris, section Cyclobalanopsis.

This oak tree grows up to 25 m tall and has been recorded from Vietnam, where it may be called sồi Quảng Trị (after the name of that Province).

References

External links
 
 

quangtriensis
Flora of Indo-China
Trees of Vietnam
Taxa named by Aimée Antoinette Camus